was a Japanese tenor singer.

Biography
He was born in Osaka. His mother Kinu Sakata was a biwa-player and a geisha, worked in Shimonoseki of Yamaguchi Prefecture. Her mother was born in Osaka too. His father, Neil Brodie Reid, (November 30, 1870 – January 19, 1920) a Scottish merchant, worked for Holme Ringer & Co., however he was not raised by his father. Tokuzaburō Fujiwara adopted him, from whom he received the family name "Fujiwara". Even so, his true father met him later in his life and put Yoshie into school. Yoshie's mother died in his youth, and Reid remained a bachelor all his life. Reid's grave is in Shimonoseki and Reid's boarding house later became the "Fujiwara Yoshie Memorial Museum".

In 1934, he established the Fujiwara Opera and became a notable figure of Japanese opera history.

References 

1898 births
1976 deaths
Japanese operatic tenors
Japanese people of Scottish descent
Opera managers
Musicians from Osaka
Musicians from Yamaguchi Prefecture
20th-century Japanese male opera singers